Prolyl 4-hydroxylase subunit alpha-1 is an enzyme that in humans is encoded by the P4HA1 gene.

This gene encodes a component of prolyl 4-hydroxylase, a key enzyme in collagen synthesis composed of two identical alpha subunits and two beta subunits. The encoded protein is one of several different types of alpha subunits and provides the major part of the catalytic site of the active enzyme. In collagen and related proteins, prolyl 4-hydroxylase catalyzes the formation of 4-hydroxyproline that is essential to the proper three-dimensional folding of newly synthesized procollagen chains. Alternatively spliced transcript variants encoding different isoforms have been described.

References

Further reading